Before 1918, both Finland and Ukraine were part of the Russian Empire. In 1918, Finland was one of the first countries to recognise Ukraine and open a diplomatic mission in Kyiv. 
Finland once again recognised Ukraine on December 30, 1991. Both countries established diplomatic relations on February 26, 1992. 
Both countries are full members of Council of Europe.

Resident diplomatic missions
 Finland has an embassy in Kyiv.
 Ukraine has an embassy in Helsinki.

Gallery

See also 
 Foreign relations of Finland
 Foreign relations of Ukraine
 Finnish Ukrainians
 Finns in Ukraine
 Ukraine–EU relations

External links 
 Finnish Ministry of Foreign Affairs about the relation with Ukraine
 Finnish embassy in Kyiv (in Finnish, Swedish and Ukrainian only) 
 Ukraine embassy in Helsinki

 

 
Ukraine
Bilateral relations of Ukraine